Daniel Prytz (born 30 September 1975) is a Swedish curler.

He is a 1997 Swedish mixed champion.

Teams

Men's

Mixed

References

External links
 
 

Living people
1975 births
Swedish male curlers
Swedish curling champions
21st-century Swedish people